Atteridgeville Happy Boys is a South African gospel choir formed in the Pretoria township of Atteridgeville. The choir is a male-only choir and it is known for their worship and songs of praise.

Notable members
 Oleseng Shuping

Notable work

Solo
 Mahlomoleng Aka (1991)
 Ikgetheleng
 Yaka Kgosi
 Rea Mo Leboha
 Marumo se

With Oleseng Shuping
 Oho Ntate Re Hauela  (2007) 
 Ke Fodile  (2006)
 Ikgetheleng (2005)
 The Best Of Atteridgeville Happy Boys (2003)
 Yaka Kgosi (2003)
 Letona La Kandase (2002)
 Motse Oa Sione (2001)
 Rea Mo Leboha (2000)
 Marumo Fase (1999)
 Moya (1996)
 Rehauhele (1995)
 Mahlomoleng A Ka (1992)
 Atteridgeville HB

References

Culture of the City of Tshwane
South African choirs